The Global Girmit Institute (GGI) Museum is co-located with the GGI Library at its headquarters in Saweni, Lautoka, Fiji. Girmit is a corruption of the English word, “agreement” from the indenture agreement the British government made with Indian labourers that consisted of specifics such as the length of stay in Fiji. The labourers came to be known as Girmityas.

Background 
Under the GGI Organisation, the Museum records Girmitiya history in Fiji from 1879 to 1916 when some 60,500 labourers came to Fiji. One of the outcomes of the first conference organised by the  GGI in 2017 was the establishment of a girmit museum.

History 
The museum has been in the current location in Lautoka since the opening in May 2018 with the introduction of a library.

Collections 
The museum will hold a collection of Fiji Indian artefacts as well as recordings of oral history of peoples from different linguistic backgrounds and cultures. Objects relating to farming and the sugar industry, lifestyle, music, food preparation, clothing and religious events will be displayed as well as objects that record the impact of colonialism on the islands.

See also 
Girmityas
Indian indenture system
Arya Samaj in Fiji
Fiji Hindi
Indo-Fijians
South Indians in Fiji
Gujaratis in Fiji
Hinduism in Fiji
Islam in Fiji
Sikhism in Fiji

References

External links 
Global Girmit Institute

Museums in Fiji
Ba Province
Museums established in 2018
2018 establishments in Fiji
Labour in Fiji
Indian diaspora in Fiji
Indentured servitude
History of Fiji
Demographic history of India
Museums of human migration